The Song Shop was a Canadian children's music television series which aired on CBC Television in 1958.

Premise
Tom Kines performed folk songs for children in this Ottawa-produced series. Episodes are set in a store which contains various items on which song selections were based. The debut episode, for example, dwelled on Irish music with guest violinist Janet Jameson who assisted Kines with a performance of "The Bard of Armagh."

Scheduling
This 15-minute series was broadcast on Tuesdays from 1 July to 14 October 1958, normally at 5:15 p.m. The debut was broadcast at 4:15 p.m. due to Dominion Day programming.

References

External links
 

CBC Television original programming
1958 Canadian television series debuts
1958 Canadian television series endings
1950s Canadian children's television series
1950s Canadian music television series
Black-and-white Canadian television shows